André Göransson and Sem Verbeek were the defending champions but chose not to defend their title.

Julian Cash and Henry Patten won the title after defeating Jonathan Eysseric and Artem Sitak 6–3, 6–2 in the final.

Seeds

Draw

References

External links
 Main draw

Championnats Banque Nationale de Granby - Men's doubles
2022 Men's doubles